Riyadh Abbas is an Iraqi former footballer.

Part of the Kelantan squad in 1996, Abbas was chosen by then coach Kelly Tham as one of the foreign players to lead the attack for the club in the Liga Perdana, the previous Malaysian top-flight before the burgeoning Malaysia Super League.

References

Year of birth missing (living people)
Living people
Iraqi footballers
Iraq international footballers
Association football forwards
Iraqi expatriate footballers
Iraqi expatriate sportspeople in Malaysia
Expatriate footballers in Malaysia
Kelantan FA players
Al-Shorta SC players